İlbasan was the Ottoman Turkish name of Elbasan, Albania

Ilbasan or Erzen was the ruler of White Horde from 1310/15 to 1320.
 
During his reign, an increase in the cities, trade, and craft occurred in the Horde. After determining the boundaries of his Horde, Ilbasan appointed his deputies. Islam was used as an instrument to strengthen authority.

He died in 1320.

Genealogy
Genghis Khan
Jochi
Orda Khan
Sartaqtay
Köchü
Bayan
Sasibuqa
Ilbasan

See also
List of Khans of the Golden Horde

References

Nomadic groups in Eurasia
Khans of the White Horde
14th-century Mongol rulers
Borjigin
1320 deaths
Year of birth unknown